The 1992 NationsBank Classic was a men's tennis tournament played on outdoor hard courts at the William H.G. FitzGerald Tennis Center in Washington, D.C. in the United States that was part of the Championship Series of the 1992 ATP Tour. It was the 24th edition of the tournament was held from July 13 through July 19, 1992. First-seeded Petr Korda won his second consecutive singles title at the event.

Finals

Singles
 Petr Korda defeated  Henrik Holm 6–4, 6–4
 It was Korda's first singles title of the year and the third of his career.

Doubles
 Bret Garnett /  Jared Palmer defeated  Ken Flach /  Todd Witsken 7–6, 6–3

References

External links
 Official website
 ATP tournament profile

Sovran Bank Classic
Washington Open (tennis)
1992 in sports in Washington, D.C.
1992 in American tennis